Angela Dwyer is an Australian social scientist and writer. Her specialist area is policing studies, with a particular interest in how lesbian, gay, bisexual, and transgender young people experience policing.

Life 
Dwyer holds bachelor degrees in sociology, and a PhD, from Queensland University of Technology. She completed her PhD in 2006 and from the following year was a senior lecturer at the university. In 2015 she was appointed to a position at the University of Tasmania.

Dwyer is a senior researcher at the Tasmanian Institute of Law Enforcement Studies and serves as a member of the Vulnerability, Resilience, and Policing Research Consortium.

Publications 

 Sex, Crime and Morality, co-written with Hayes, S. and Carpenter, B., Routledge, 2012
Queering Criminology, co-edited with Ball, M. and Crofts, C., Springer, 2016

References

Academic staff of the University of Tasmania
Academic staff of Queensland University of Technology
Queensland University of Technology alumni
Living people
Year of birth missing (living people)